The Central African Republic competed at the 2004 Summer Olympics in Athens, Greece, from 13 to 29 August 2004. The country also made its Paralympic Games début this year.

Athletics 

Athletes from the Central African Republic have so far achieved qualifying standards in the following athletics events (up to a maximum of 3 athletes in each event at the 'A' Standard, and 1 at the 'B' Standard). 

Men

Women

Key
Note–Ranks given for track events are within the athlete's heat only
Q = Qualified for the next round
q = Qualified for the next round as a fastest loser or, in field events, by position without achieving the qualifying target
NR = National record
N/A = Round not applicable for the event
Bye = Athlete not required to compete in round

Judo

Taekwondo

Bertrand Gbongou Liango led a score of 4–1 against Austria's Tuncay Çalışkan, but he was knocked unconscious during his match. Following a mouth-to-mouth resuscitation, he was taken to hospital and diagnosed with a concussion.

See also
 Central African Republic at the 2004 Summer Paralympics

References

External links
Official Report of the XXVIII Olympiad

Nations at the 2004 Summer Olympics
2004
Oly